Arjun Jayaraj (born 5 March 1996) is an Indian professional footballer who plays as an attacking midfielder for Gokulam Kerala in I-League.

Career

Early career
Born in Malappuram, Kerala, Arjun is a product of the MSP sports hostel. He played for Calicut University and won the All-India Championship. While playing for his university team against Gokulam Kerala in a friendly, he scored a goal and impressed Gokulam head coach Bino George who signed him.

Gokulam Kerala FC

2017–18 
Arjun played for the club in the Kerala Premier League and scored a goal in the final to help Gokulam win the title. He was included in the I-League squad and made his professional debut for Gokulam Kerala on 22 December 2017 against Indian Arrows. On 27 January 2017 he scored his debut goal, a last minute winner, as Gokulam Kerala won 3–2 over Shillong Lajong.

2018–19 
He started in the first game of the season against Mohun Bagan and he was awarded the Hero of the match. But then only started once in the following three games. On 30 November 2018, he scored his first goal of the season against Churchill Brothers which finished as a 1-1 draw and he was awarded the Hero of the match.

Kerala Blasters FC

2019-2020

On 29 July 2019, it was announced that Arjun would join Kerala Blasters FC from Gokulam Kerala FC which involves transfer fee of 21 lakhs rupees. However he broke his ligament during the pre-season training and missed the entire 2019-20 season. On 4 December 2020, Kerala Blasters announced that in order to get sufficient playing time, the club and Arjun Jayaraj have parted ways on mutual consents.

Career statistics

Club

References

External links
 

1996 births
Living people
Indian footballers
Association football midfielders
Footballers from Kerala
I-League players
Indian Super League players
Kerala Blasters FC players
I-League 2nd Division players
Kerala United FC players
Gokulam Kerala FC players